The European Journal of International Management (EJIM) is a collaborative, scholarly, and peer-reviewed academic journal dealing with issues ranging from international business and management.

It is indexed in Scopus and Web of Science.

References

External links
 European Journal of International Management information on InderScience

Business and management journals
Publications established in 2007